The 1963 Pittsburgh Pirates season was the 82nd season of the Pittsburgh Pirates franchise; the 77th in the National League. The Pirates finished eighth in the league standings with a record of 74–88.

Offseason 
 November 19, 1962: Dick Groat and Diomedes Olivo were traded by the Pirates to the St. Louis Cardinals for Don Cardwell and Julio Gotay.

Regular season 
On April 8, Pete Rose made his major league debut for the Cincinnati Reds in a game against the Pirates. He had three at bats without a hit.

Season standings

Record vs. opponents

Game log

|- bgcolor="ffbbbb"
| 1 || April 8 || @ Reds || 2–5 || O'Toole || Francis (0–1) || — || 28,896 || 0–1
|- bgcolor="ccffcc"
| 2 || April 9 || Braves || 3–2 || Face (1–0) || Hendley || — || 29,615 || 1–1
|- bgcolor="ccffcc"
| 3 || April 10 || Braves || 3–2 || Cardwell (1–0) || Shaw || Veale (1) || 3,601 || 2–1
|- bgcolor="ccffcc"
| 4 || April 13 || @ Reds || 12–4 || Friend (1–0) || O'Toole || — || 4,481 || 3–1
|- bgcolor="ccffcc"
| 5 || April 14 || @ Reds || 1–0 || McBean (1–0) || Jay || — || 4,864 || 4–1
|- bgcolor="ffbbbb"
| 6 || April 16 || @ Cardinals || 3–4 || Fanok || Face (1–1) || — || 8,301 || 4–2
|- bgcolor="ffbbbb"
| 7 || April 17 || @ Cardinals || 3–7 || Washburn || Cardwell (1–1) || — || 7,481 || 4–3
|- bgcolor="ccffcc"
| 8 || April 18 || @ Cardinals || 3–2 || Schwall (1–0) || Olivo || Face (1) || 6,497 || 5–3
|- bgcolor="ccffcc"
| 9 || April 20 || Reds || 4–2 || Friend (2–0) || Jay || — || 12,235 || 6–3
|- bgcolor="ffbbbb"
| 10 || April 21 || Reds || 3–8 || Maloney || McBean (1–1) || — || 18,070 || 6–4
|- bgcolor="ccffcc"
| 11 || April 22 || Cubs || 2–0 || Francis (1–1) || Hobbie || Face (2) || 5,289 || 7–4
|- bgcolor="ffbbbb"
| 12 || April 23 || Cubs || 2–7 || Jackson || Cardwell (1–2) || — || 968 || 7–5
|- bgcolor="ccffcc"
| 13 || April 24 || @ Phillies || 6–4 || Friend (3–0) || Short || Face (3) || 4,485 || 8–5
|- bgcolor="ccffcc"
| 14 || April 26 || Mets || 5–2 || Haddix (1–0) || Jackson || Sisk (1) || 10,531 || 9–5
|- bgcolor="ccffcc"
| 15 || April 27 || Mets || 2–1 || Gibbon (1–0) || Hook || — || 8,011 || 10–5
|- bgcolor="ccffcc"
| 16 || April 28 || Mets || 3–2 || Face (2–1) || Stallard || — || 12,057 || 11–5
|-

|- bgcolor="ffbbbb"
| 17 || May 1 || Giants || 1–5 || Sanford || Friend (3–1) || — || 6,122 || 11–6
|- bgcolor="ffbbbb"
| 18 || May 2 || Giants || 1–2 || Marichal || Cardwell (1–3) || — || 9,563 || 11–7
|- bgcolor="ccffcc"
| 19 || May 3 || Dodgers || 13–2 || McBean (2–1) || Sherry || — || 16,960 || 12–7
|- bgcolor="ccffcc"
| 20 || May 4 || Dodgers || 5–0 || Schwall (2–0) || Miller || — || 12,037 || 13–7
|- bgcolor="ffbbbb"
| 21 || May 5 || Dodgers || 3–7 || Perranoski || Law (0–1) || — || 18,743 || 13–8
|- bgcolor="ccffcc"
| 22 || May 6 || Dodgers || 7–4 || Gibbon (2–0) || Drysdale || Face (4) || 5,376 || 14–8
|- bgcolor="ffbbbb"
| 23 || May 7 || @ Cubs || 4–5 || Jackson || Cardwell (1–4) || — || 6,012 || 14–9
|- bgcolor="ffbbbb"
| 24 || May 8 || @ Cubs || 5–9 || Elston || Face (2–2) || — || 6,350 || 14–10
|- bgcolor="ffbbbb"
| 25 || May 9 || @ Cubs || 1–3 || Ellsworth || Schwall (2–1) || — || 5,961 || 14–11
|- bgcolor="ffbbbb"
| 26 || May 10 || Cardinals || 0–1 || Simmons || Friend (3–2) || — || 16,739 || 14–12
|- bgcolor="ccffcc"
| 27 || May 11 || Cardinals || 3–2 || Law (1–1) || Washburn || Face (5) || 7,743 || 15–12
|- bgcolor="ffbbbb"
| 28 || May 12 || Cardinals || 1–2 (12) || Taylor || Face (2–3) || Shantz ||  || 15–13
|- bgcolor="ccffcc"
| 29 || May 12 || Cardinals || 4–3 || McBean (3–1) || Sadecki || — || 22,280 || 16–13
|- bgcolor="ffbbbb"
| 30 || May 14 || @ Giants || 1–3 || Sanford || Friend (3–3) || Bolin || 14,847 || 16–14
|- bgcolor="ffbbbb"
| 31 || May 15 || @ Giants || 3–4 || Marichal || Cardwell (1–5) || Bolin || 10,386 || 16–15
|- bgcolor="ffbbbb"
| 32 || May 16 || @ Dodgers || 0–1 || Podres || Schwall (2–2) || — || 21,287 || 16–16
|- bgcolor="ffbbbb"
| 33 || May 17 || @ Dodgers || 3–9 || Miller || Gibbon (2–1) || Scott || 34,216 || 16–17
|- bgcolor="ffbbbb"
| 34 || May 18 || @ Dodgers || 4–6 || Drysdale || Law (1–2) || — || 21,140 || 16–18
|- bgcolor="ccffcc"
| 35 || May 19 || @ Colt .45s || 5–0 || Friend (4–3) || Farrell || — || 8,847 || 17–18
|- bgcolor="ffbbbb"
| 36 || May 20 || @ Colt .45s || 0–2 || Drott || Cardwell (1–6) || — || 5,281 || 17–19
|- bgcolor="ccffcc"
| 37 || May 21 || @ Colt .45s || 6–5 || McBean (4–1) || Umbricht || Face (6) || 6,329 || 18–19
|- bgcolor="ccffcc"
| 38 || May 22 || @ Colt .45s || 4–3 || Francis (2–1) || Nottebart || Face (7) || 5,577 || 19–19
|- bgcolor="ccffcc"
| 39 || May 24 || @ Braves || 7–2 || Friend (5–3) || Spahn || — || 7,731 || 20–19
|- bgcolor="ffbbbb"
| 40 || May 25 || @ Braves || 0–1 || Shaw || Gibbon (2–2) || — || 7,981 || 20–20
|- bgcolor="ccffcc"
| 41 || May 26 || @ Braves || 5–2 (11) || McBean (5–1) || Funk || Veale (2) || 9,794 || 21–20
|- bgcolor="ffbbbb"
| 42 || May 28 || Phillies || 1–5 || McLish || Friend (5–4) || — || 8,497 || 21–21
|- bgcolor="ccffcc"
| 43 || May 30 || Phillies || 7–1 || Cardwell (2–6) || Mahaffey || — ||  || 22–21
|- bgcolor="ffbbbb"
| 44 || May 30 || Phillies || 5–6 || Culp || Gibbon (2–3) || Klippstein || 19,039 || 22–22
|- bgcolor="ccffcc"
| 45 || May 31 || @ Mets || 2–0 || Schwall (3–2) || Willey || — || 16,236 || 23–22
|-

|- bgcolor="ccffcc"
| 46 || June 1 || @ Mets || 10–1 || Friend (6–4) || Cisco || — || 11,800 || 24–22
|- bgcolor="ffbbbb"
| 47 || June 2 || @ Mets || 1–2 (10) || Bearnarth || Face (2–4) || — ||  || 24–23
|- bgcolor="ffbbbb"
| 48 || June 2 || @ Mets || 3–4 (10) || Hook || Face (2–5) || — || 18,844 || 24–24
|- bgcolor="ccffcc"
| 49 || June 5 || Reds || 5–4 || Veale (1–0) || Tsitouris || Haddix (1) ||  || 25–24
|- bgcolor="ccffcc"
| 50 || June 5 || Reds || 4–3 || Friend (7–4) || Purkey || Veale (3) || 11,855 || 26–24
|- bgcolor="ffbbbb"
| 51 || June 6 || Reds || 5–7 || Maloney || Gibbon (2–4) || Henry ||  || 26–25
|- bgcolor="ffbbbb"
| 52 || June 6 || Reds || 5–10 || Jay || Schwall (3–3) || — || 12,309 || 26–26
|- bgcolor="ffbbbb"
| 53 || June 7 || Braves || 5–9 || Funk || Haddix (1–1) || Hendley || 15,084 || 26–27
|- bgcolor="ccffcc"
| 54 || June 8 || Braves || 6–4 || McBean (6–1) || Cloninger || — || 9,650 || 27–27
|- bgcolor="ccffcc"
| 55 || June 9 || Braves || 4–0 || Friend (8–4) || Lemaster || — ||  || 28–27
|- bgcolor="ffbbbb"
| 56 || June 9 || Braves || 3–5 || Spahn || Cardwell (2–7) || Shaw || 18,209 || 28–28
|- bgcolor="ffbbbb"
| 57 || June 11 || Cardinals || 1–3 || Gibson || Schwall (3–4) || — || 17,098 || 28–29
|- bgcolor="ffbbbb"
| 58 || June 12 || @ Reds || 0–3 || O'Toole || Francis (2–2) || — || 8,472 || 28–30
|- bgcolor="ffbbbb"
| 59 || June 13 || @ Reds || 2–4 || Tsitouris || Cardwell (2–8) || — || 7,053 || 28–31
|- bgcolor="ffbbbb"
| 60 || June 14 || @ Cardinals || 2–5 || Sadecki || Friend (8–5) || Shantz || 20,874 || 28–32
|- bgcolor="ccffcc"
| 61 || June 16 || @ Cardinals || 4–3 (12) || McBean (7–1) || Bauta || — ||  || 29–32
|- bgcolor="ffbbbb"
| 62 || June 16 || @ Cardinals || 7–11 || Simmons || Law (1–3) || Taylor || 26,020 || 29–33
|- bgcolor="ccffcc"
| 63 || June 17 || @ Braves || 9–3 || Cardwell (3–8) || Cloninger || — || 8,631 || 30–33
|- bgcolor="ffbbbb"
| 64 || June 18 || @ Braves || 5–7 (10) || Shaw || McBean (7–2) || — || 7,397 || 30–34
|- bgcolor="ccffcc"
| 65 || June 19 || @ Braves || 6–2 || Francis (3–2) || Sadowski || Gibbon (1) || 6,715 || 31–34
|- bgcolor="ffbbbb"
| 66 || June 20 || @ Braves || 1–2 || Lemaster || Haddix (1–2) || — || 6,496 || 31–35
|- bgcolor="ffbbbb"
| 67 || June 21 || @ Cubs || 5–6 (10) || Elston || Gibbon (2–5) || — || 13,321 || 31–36
|- bgcolor="ccffcc"
| 68 || June 22 || @ Cubs || 3–0 || Friend (9–5) || Ellsworth || — || 20,761 || 32–36
|- bgcolor="ccffcc"
| 69 || June 23 || @ Cubs || 7–6 || Haddix (2–2) || Hobbie || McBean (1) || 26,158 || 33–36
|- bgcolor="ffbbbb"
| 70 || June 25 || Phillies || 4–5 (10) || Klippstein || Haddix (2–3) || Bennett || 12,365 || 33–37
|- bgcolor="ffbbbb"
| 71 || June 26 || Phillies || 2–6 || McLish || Friend (9–6) || — || 9,153 || 33–38
|- bgcolor="ffbbbb"
| 72 || June 27 || Phillies || 4–13 || Culp || Cardwell (3–9) || Klippstein || 9,576 || 33–39
|- bgcolor="ccffcc"
| 73 || June 28 || Mets || 3–1 || Gibbon (3–5) || Craig || McBean (2) || 10,073 || 34–39
|- bgcolor="ccffcc"
| 74 || June 29 || Mets || 4–3 || McBean (8–2) || Bearnarth || — || 13,846 || 35–39
|- bgcolor="ccffcc"
| 75 || June 30 || Mets || 3–0 || Friend (10–6) || Stallard || McBean (3) || 12,429 || 36–39
|-

|- bgcolor="ccffcc"
| 76 || July 1 || @ Phillies || 2–1 || Cardwell (4–9) || Culp || — ||  || 37–39
|- bgcolor="ffbbbb"
| 77 || July 1 || @ Phillies || 1–8 || McLish || Francis (3–3) || — || 21,661 || 37–40
|- bgcolor="ccffcc"
| 78 || July 2 || @ Phillies || 3–2 || Law (2–3) || Green || McBean (4) || 6,844 || 38–40
|- bgcolor="ffbbbb"
| 79 || July 4 || @ Phillies || 0–1 (10) || Mahaffey || Friend (10–7) || — ||  || 38–41
|- bgcolor="ffbbbb"
| 80 || July 4 || @ Phillies || 1–5 || Duren || Gibbon (3–6) || — || 16,198 || 38–42
|- bgcolor="ccffcc"
| 81 || July 5 || @ Mets || 3–1 || Cardwell (5–9) || Stallard || McBean (5) || 6,779 || 39–42
|- bgcolor="ccffcc"
| 82 || July 6 || @ Mets || 11–3 || Schwall (4–4) || Jackson || Face (8) || 22,698 || 40–42
|- bgcolor="ccffcc"
| 83 || July 7 || @ Mets || 11–5 || Law (3–3) || Hook || McBean (6) || 9,741 || 41–42
|- bgcolor="ffbbbb"
| 84 || July 10 || Colt .45s || 0–2 || Johnson || Friend (10–8) || Woodeshick || 6,517 || 41–43
|- bgcolor="ccffcc"
| 85 || July 11 || Colt .45s || 3–0 || Cardwell (6–9) || Farrell || — || 6,896 || 42–43
|- bgcolor="ccffcc"
| 86 || July 12 || Colt .45s || 2–1 || Schwall (5–4) || Bruce || Face (9) || 8,997 || 43–43
|- bgcolor="ccffcc"
| 87 || July 13 || Colt .45s || 3–0 || Law (4–3) || Drott || — || 6,775 || 44–43
|- bgcolor="ccffcc"
| 88 || July 15 || Giants || 2–1 || McBean (9–2) || Marichal || — ||  || 45–43
|- bgcolor="ccffcc"
| 89 || July 15 || Giants || 4–1 || Gibbon (4–6) || O'Dell || — || 24,357 || 46–43
|- bgcolor="ffbbbb"
| 90 || July 16 || Giants || 2–3 || Fisher || Cardwell (6–10) || Pierce ||  || 46–44
|- bgcolor="ccffcc"
| 91 || July 16 || Giants || 3–2 || Schwall (6–4) || Sanford || McBean (7) || 23,251 || 47–44
|- bgcolor="ffbbbb"
| 92 || July 17 || Dodgers || 2–3 || Miller || Law (4–4) || Perranoski || 16,658 || 47–45
|- bgcolor="ffbbbb"
| 93 || July 18 || Dodgers || 5–10 || Podres || Francis (3–4) || Sherry || 15,883 || 47–46
|- bgcolor="ccffcc"
| 94 || July 19 || Cubs || 9–4 || Friend (11–8) || Ellsworth || McBean (8) || 13,670 || 48–46
|- bgcolor="ffbbbb"
| 95 || July 21 || Cubs || 1–5 || Toth || Cardwell (6–11) || — ||  || 48–47
|- bgcolor="ccffcc"
| 96 || July 21 || Cubs || 6–5 (14) || Cardwell (7–11) || Warner || — || 21,576 || 49–47
|- bgcolor="ffbbbb"
| 97 || July 23 || @ Dodgers || 0–6 || Podres || Friend (11–9) || — || 33,167 || 49–48
|- bgcolor="ffbbbb"
| 98 || July 24 || @ Dodgers || 1–5 || Drysdale || Francis (3–5) || — || 30,462 || 49–49
|- bgcolor="ccffcc"
| 99 || July 25 || @ Dodgers || 6–2 || Sisk (1–0) || Koufax || — || 41,154 || 50–49
|- bgcolor="ffbbbb"
| 100 || July 26 || @ Giants || 4–6 || Fisher || Face (2–6) || — || 27,017 || 50–50
|- bgcolor="ffbbbb"
| 101 || July 27 || @ Giants || 1–3 || Marichal || McBean (9–3) || — || 23,021 || 50–51
|- bgcolor="ffbbbb"
| 102 || July 28 || @ Giants || 1–3 || Sanford || Schwall (6–5) || — || 32,412 || 50–52
|- bgcolor="ffbbbb"
| 103 || July 29 || @ Giants || 4–5 || Duffalo || Law (4–5) || Pierce || 12,089 || 50–53
|- bgcolor="ccffcc"
| 104 || July 30 || @ Colt .45s || 8–1 || Gibbon (5–6) || Brown || — || 6,976 || 51–53
|- bgcolor="ccffcc"
| 105 || July 31 || @ Colt .45s || 6–3 || Friend (12–9) || Woodeshick || Face (10) || 6,093 || 52–53
|-

|- bgcolor="ffbbbb"
| 106 || August 2 || @ Reds || 0–3 || Maloney || Cardwell (7–12) || — || 14,807 || 52–54
|- bgcolor="ccffcc"
| 107 || August 3 || @ Reds || 5–4 || McBean (10–3) || Tsitouris || — || 7,157 || 53–54
|- bgcolor="ffbbbb"
| 108 || August 4 || @ Reds || 2–5 || Purkey || Friend (12–10) || — ||  || 53–55
|- bgcolor="ffbbbb"
| 109 || August 4 || @ Reds || 1–4 || Nuxhall || Gibbon (5–7) || — || 18,380 || 53–56
|- bgcolor="ccffcc"
| 110 || August 6 || Braves || 3–0 || Cardwell (8–12) || Lemaster || McBean (9) || 9,992 || 54–56
|- bgcolor="ccffcc"
| 111 || August 7 || Braves || 5–4 || McBean (11–3) || Raymond || — || 8,124 || 55–56
|- bgcolor="ccffcc"
| 112 || August 8 || Braves || 1–0 || Friend (13–10) || Sadowski || — || 9,110 || 56–56
|- bgcolor="ffbbbb"
| 113 || August 9 || Colt .45s || 6–7 (15) || Woodeshick || Schwall (6–6) || — ||  || 56–57
|- bgcolor="ccffcc"
| 114 || August 9 || Colt .45s || 7–6 (11) || McBean (12–3) || Drott || — || 9,420 || 57–57
|- bgcolor="ccffcc"
| 115 || August 10 || Colt .45s || 3–2 || Cardwell (9–12) || Nottebart || Face (11) || 7,951 || 58–57
|- bgcolor="ccffcc"
| 116 || August 11 || Colt .45s || 2–1 || Face (3–6) || Brown || — || 8,093 || 59–57
|- bgcolor="ccffcc"
| 117 || August 12 || Colt .45s || 4–2 || Friend (14–10) || Farrell || Face (12) || 7,240 || 60–57
|- bgcolor="ffbbbb"
| 118 || August 14 || @ Mets || 2–4 || Jackson || Schwall (6–7) || Bearnarth || 9,406 || 60–58
|- bgcolor="ccffcc"
| 119 || August 15 || @ Mets || 8–2 || Cardwell (10–12) || Cisco || — || 7,822 || 61–58
|- bgcolor="ffbbbb"
| 120 || August 16 || Phillies || 0–3 || Short || Gibbon (5–8) || — || 12,031 || 61–59
|- bgcolor="ffbbbb"
| 121 || August 17 || Phillies || 3–5 || Duren || Friend (14–11) || — || 7,881 || 61–60
|- bgcolor="ffbbbb"
| 122 || August 18 || Phillies || 1–3 || Klippstein || Schwall (6–8) || — || 10,696 || 61–61
|- bgcolor="ccffcc"
| 123 || August 20 || @ Cubs || 5–3 || Cardwell (11–12) || Buhl || Face (13) || 15,161 || 62–61
|- bgcolor="ccffcc"
| 124 || August 21 || @ Cubs || 7–6 || McBean (13–3) || McDaniel || Face (14) || 15,341 || 63–61
|- bgcolor="ccffcc"
| 125 || August 22 || @ Cubs || 9–3 || Friend (15–11) || Jackson || McBean (10) || 9,310 || 64–61
|- bgcolor="ffbbbb"
| 126 || August 23 || @ Phillies || 2–4 || Bennett || Schwall (6–9) || Baldschun || 18,126 || 64–62
|- bgcolor="ccffcc"
| 127 || August 24 || @ Phillies || 7–0 || Cardwell (12–12) || Short || — || 18,276 || 65–62
|- bgcolor="ffbbbb"
| 128 || August 25 || @ Phillies || 2–4 (11) || Baldschun || Face (3–7) || — || 10,183 || 65–63
|- bgcolor="ccffcc"
| 129 || August 27 || Mets || 2–1 || Friend (16–11) || Cisco || — || 7,819 || 66–63
|- bgcolor="ccffcc"
| 130 || August 28 || Mets || 7–2 || Cardwell (13–12) || Jackson || Face (15) || 6,123 || 67–63
|- bgcolor="ffbbbb"
| 131 || August 29 || Mets || 4–7 || Craig || Gibbon (5–9) || Bearnarth || 10,148 || 67–64
|- bgcolor="ffbbbb"
| 132 || August 30 || Reds || 1–2 || Nuxhall || Schwall (6–10) || Henry || 10,924 || 67–65
|- bgcolor="ffbbbb"
| 133 || August 31 || Reds || 0–6 || O'Toole || Friend (16–12) || Zanni || 7,759 || 67–66
|-

|- bgcolor="ccffcc"
| 134 || September 1 || Reds || 6–4 || Francis (4–5) || Worthington || — || 8,820 || 68–66
|- bgcolor="ffbbbb"
| 135 || September 2 || @ Cardinals || 1–6 || Gibson || Veale (1–1) || — ||  || 68–67
|- bgcolor="ffbbbb"
| 136 || September 2 || @ Cardinals || 2–6 || Taylor || Gibbon (5–10) || — || 22,458 || 68–68
|- bgcolor="ffbbbb"
| 137 || September 3 || @ Cardinals || 5–10 || Shantz || Face (3–8) || — || 3,925 || 68–69
|- bgcolor="ffbbbb"
| 138 || September 4 || @ Braves || 0–1 || Spahn || Friend (16–13) || — || 6,219 || 68–70
|- bgcolor="ffbbbb"
| 139 || September 5 || @ Braves || 0–8 || Sadowski || Parsons (0–1) || — || 4,699 || 68–71
|- bgcolor="ffbbbb"
| 140 || September 6 || Cardinals || 1–5 || Gibson || Cardwell (13–13) || — ||  || 68–72
|- bgcolor="ccffcc"
| 141 || September 6 || Cardinals || 5–0 || Veale (2–1) || Taylor || — || 11,825 || 69–72
|- bgcolor="ffbbbb"
| 142 || September 7 || Cardinals || 5–6 || Schultz || Haddix (2–4) || Burdette || 8,427 || 69–73
|- bgcolor="ffbbbb"
| 143 || September 8 || Cardinals || 2–3 || Broglio || Friend (16–14) || Taylor || 14,866 || 69–74
|- bgcolor="ffbbbb"
| 144 || September 10 || Dodgers || 2–4 || Koufax || Cardwell (13–14) || — || 11,152 || 69–75
|- bgcolor="ffbbbb"
| 145 || September 11 || Dodgers || 4–9 || Richert || Veale (2–2) || Perranoski || 8,514 || 69–76
|- bgcolor="ffbbbb"
| 146 || September 12 || Dodgers || 3–5 || Podres || Friend (16–15) || Perranoski || 2,644 || 69–77
|- bgcolor="ccffcc"
| 147 || September 13 || Giants || 5–4 (13) || Friend (17–15) || Garibaldi || — || 6,100 || 70–77
|- bgcolor="ffbbbb"
| 148 || September 14 || Giants || 3–7 || Sanford || Cardwell (13–15) || Pierce || 5,489 || 70–78
|- bgcolor="ffbbbb"
| 149 || September 15 || Giants || 5–13 || O'Dell || Schwall (6–11) || — || 18,916 || 70–79
|- bgcolor="ccffcc"
| 150 || September 16 || Cubs || 1–0 || Veale (3–2) || Jackson || — || 2,917 || 71–79
|- bgcolor="ffbbbb"
| 151 || September 17 || Cubs || 1–3 || Buhl || Friend (17–16) || McDaniel ||  || 71–80
|- bgcolor="ccffcc"
| 152 || September 17 || Cubs || 4–3 || Haddix (3–4) || McDaniel || McBean (11) || 5,160 || 72–80
|- bgcolor="ffbbbb"
| 153 || September 18 || Cubs || 1–2 || Elston || Gibbon (5–11) || — || 5,891 || 72–81
|- bgcolor="ffbbbb"
| 154 || September 20 || @ Dodgers || 0–2 || Drysdale || Schwall (6–12) || — || 40,476 || 72–82
|- bgcolor="ffbbbb"
| 155 || September 21 || @ Dodgers || 3–5 || Miller || Sisk (1–1) || — || 48,038 || 72–83
|- bgcolor="ccffcc"
| 156 || September 22 || @ Dodgers || 4–0 || Veale (4–2) || Podres || Face (16) || 36,878 || 73–83
|- bgcolor="ffbbbb"
| 157 || September 24 || @ Colt .45s || 2–3 || Zachary || Francis (4–6) || Woodeshick || 3,144 || 73–84
|- bgcolor="ffbbbb"
| 158 || September 25 || @ Colt .45s || 1–2 || Johnson || Sisk (1–2) || Farrell || 3,118 || 73–85
|- bgcolor="ffbbbb"
| 159 || September 26 || @ Colt .45s || 4–5 (11) || McMahon || Face (3–9) || — || 2,782 || 73–86
|- bgcolor="ccffcc"
| 160 || September 27 || @ Giants || 8–3 || Veale (5–2) || Bolin || — || 10,725 || 74–86
|- bgcolor="ffbbbb"
| 161 || September 28 || @ Giants || 2–3 || Marichal || Gibbon (5–12) || — || 10,332 || 74–87
|- bgcolor="ffbbbb"
| 162 || September 29 || @ Giants || 2–4 || Sanford || Sisk (1–3) || O'Dell || 33,301 || 74–88
|-

|-
| Legend:       = Win       = LossBold = Pirates team member

Opening Day lineup

Notable transactions 
 April 4, 1963: Howie Goss and cash were traded by the Pirates to the Houston Colt .45s for Manny Mota.

Roster

Statistics
Batting
Note: G = Games played; AB = At bats; H = Hits; Avg. = Batting average; HR = Home runs; RBI = Runs batted in

Pitching
Note: G = Games pitched; IP = Innings pitched; W = Wins; L = Losses; ERA = Earned run average; SO = Strikeouts

Awards and honors 
All-Star Game
Bill Mazeroski, second base, (selected as starter but did not play due to injury)
Roberto Clemente, reserve

Farm system 

LEAGUE CHAMPIONS: Batavia

Notes

References 
 1963 Pittsburgh Pirates team page at Baseball Reference
 1963 Pittsburgh Pirates Page at Baseball Almanac

Pittsburgh Pirates seasons
Pittsburgh Pirates season
1963 in sports in Pennsylvania